Gerstein is a surname. Notable people with the surname include:

 David Gerstein (born 1974), comics author and editor as well as an animation historian
 Dudu Gerstein (born 1944), Israeli painter and sculptor
 Emma Gerstein (1903–2002), Russian historian and literary critic
 Irving Gerstein (born 1941), Canadian businessman, politician, Conservative member of the Canadian Senate
 Jonah Gerstein (1827–1891), Lithuanian educationalist and Hebraist
 Kirill Gerstein (born 1979), American and Russian pianist
 Kurt Gerstein (1905–1945), German SS officer and member of the Institute for Hygiene of the Waffen-SS
 Leila Gerstein, American television producer and screenwriter
 Luisa Gerstein, British singer-songwriter and member of Landshapes
 Mark B. Gerstein, American scientist working in bioinformatics
 Mordicai Gerstein (1935–2019), American artist, writer, and film director
 Noemí Gerstein (1910–1996), Argentine sculptor
 Reva Gerstein, CC OOnt (1917–2020), Canadian psychologist and educator

See also
 Gerstein Science Information Centre, the University of Toronto's flagship library supporting the sciences and health sciences
 Gerstein Report, written by Kurt Gerstein
 Geierstein
 Gershtein
 Gersten